The women's 200 metres sprint competition of the athletics events at the 1979 Pan American Games took place on 9 and 11 July at the Estadio Sixto Escobar. The defending Pan American Games champion was Chandra Cheeseborough of the United States.

Records
Prior to this competition, the existing world and Pan American Games records were as follows:

Results
All times shown are in seconds. Evelyn Ashford's mark in the final was not considered a new Pan American record because of favorable wind of 2.12 m/s.

Heats
Held on 9 July

Wind:Heat 1: +4.7 m/s, Heat 2: +2.8 m/s, Heat 3: +2.3 m/s

Semifinals
Held on 9 July

Wind:Heat 1: +1.7 m/s, Heat 2: +2.5 m/s

Final
Held on 11 July

Wind: +2.2 m/s

References

Athletics at the 1979 Pan American Games
1979